Sir Thomas Herbert Parry-Williams (21 September 1887 – 3 March 1975) was a Welsh poet, author and academic.

Parry-Williams was born at Tŷ'r Ysgol ('the Schoolhouse') in Rhyd Ddu, Caernarfonshire, Wales. He was educated at the University College of Wales, Aberystwyth, Jesus College, Oxford, the University of Freiburg and the Sorbonne.  As a poet, he was the first to win the double of Chair and Crown at the National Eisteddfod of Wales, a feat which he achieved at Wrexham in 1912 and repeated at Bangor in 1915. He was a conscientious objector during the First World War. He was Professor of Welsh at the University of Wales, Aberystwyth, from 1920 until 1952.  He co-founded the university's Centre for Advanced Welsh and Celtic Studies. He was awarded D.Litt. degrees by the Universities of Wales (1934) and Oxford (1937).  He was knighted in 1958.  He was also given an honorary doctorate by the University of Wales in 1960 and made an Honorary Fellow of Jesus College, Oxford, in 1968.

Published works
The English element in Welsh (1923)
Ysgrifau (1928)
Cerddi (1931)
Carolau Richard White (1931)
Canu Rhydd Cynnar (1932)
Olion (1935)
Synfyfyrion (1937)
Hen benillion (1940)
Lloffion (1942)
O'r pedwar gwynt (1944)
Ugain o gerddi (1949)
Myfyrdodau (1957)
Pensynnu (1966)
Detholiad o gerddi (1972)

Bibliography
Meic Stephens (ed.) Cydymaith i Lenyddiaeth Cymru (1986)

References

External links
 English verse-translation of Parry-Williams's poem "Tŷ'r Ysgol"
 some English verse translations in the Penguin Book of Welsh Verse (1967)

1887 births
1975 deaths
Chaired bards
Crowned bards
Alumni of Jesus College, Oxford
University of Paris alumni
Alumni of Aberystwyth University
Academics of Aberystwyth University
People from Gwynedd
Knights Bachelor
People educated at Ysgol Eifionydd, Porthmadog
20th-century Welsh poets
Welsh-speaking academics
Welsh conscientious objectors